Lake Center (also called Center Lake) is a lake in Osceola County, in the U.S. state of Florida.

References 

Lakes of Osceola County, Florida
Lakes of Florida